Nanami Inoue (井上 奈々朱 Inoue Nanami, born 19 June 1989) is a Japanese volleyball player who plays for Denso Airybees.

Profiles

Clubs
ShimokitazawaSeitoku High School → Denso Airybees (2008-) → Shikoku Eighty 8 Queen (Rental transferring for register:2008-2009)

National team
 2008 - 1st AVC Women's Cup

Awards

Individuals
1st AVC Women's Cup : Best Server award

Team
2008 57th Kurowashiki All Japan Volleyball Championship -  Champion, with Denso.
2010 Empress's Cup -  Champion, with Denso.

References

External links
JVA Biography
Denso Official Website Profile

1989 births
Living people
Japanese women's volleyball players
People from Western Tokyo